Russell is an unincorporated community and census-designated place in Pine Grove Township, Warren County, Pennsylvania, United States.  The community is east of Lander and lies at the intersection of U.S. Route 62 and Pennsylvania Route 957. It is drained by Conewango Creek.  As of the 2010 census, the population was 1,408.

References

Census-designated places in Warren County, Pennsylvania
Census-designated places in Pennsylvania
Unincorporated communities in Warren County, Pennsylvania
Unincorporated communities in Pennsylvania